Maethelvin (a.k.a. Nicolas Bataille) is an Electronic / Synthwave musician from Nantes, France, and member of the Valerie Collective. With inspiration from artists as Jan Hammer and Giorgio Moroder, Maethelvin has made electronic music since 2007
and plays live together with artists as College and Forgotten Illusions. Releasing singles since 2007 he released his debut album  CS005  2015.

Discography

Singles
 The Last Escape / Cruising (2009, with Stephen Falken)
 As We Were (2013, Valerie Records)
 Love Theme (2016, with Robert Parker

Albums
 CS005 (2015, Valerie Records)

References

French electronic musicians
Musicians from Nantes
1982 births
Living people
Nu-disco musicians